JP Dange was the Chief Secretary Government of Maharashtra and  Civil service IAS officer in Maharashtra. He Graduated from Nagpur University with Bachelors in Law (L.L.B) and Commerce (B.Com) and Post-graduated from Pune University with Masters in Business Administration (M.B.A). He further did M.Sc in Development Administration from Bath University (United Kingdom) under the Colombo Plan. He was 'AIR' - 38 at Combined Defense Services Examination 1972 in first attempt and appointed as Commissioned Officer in IAF at Defense Services Staff College, Wellington by the President of India. He was 'AIR' - 23 at the Union Public Service Commission Civil Services Examination 1973 in first attempt and got selected in the Indian Administrative Service (I.A.S) at age of 21.  He was appointed by the Union and State Government as the youngest 'Home Secretary' at age of 37 Years after the serial Bombay Bomb Blasts, 1993. He was tasked as Competent Authority in capacity of Hon'ble Chief Secretary in management of Ajmal Kasab Hanging - Operation X in 2011-12. In recognition of his long and illustrious Administrative Service of 46 Years, he was given 'Best Governance Award' by Government of India, Ministry of Housing and Urban Affairs in 2020.

Positions held in Election Commission of India, Govt. Of India 
▪General Observer - M.P Baramulla, J & K. 2006

▪General Observer - M.L.A Bikaner, Rajasthan. 2005

▪General Observer - M.P Patna, Bihar. 2004

▪General Observer - M.L.A Aizawl, Mizoram. 2003

▪General Observer - M.L.A Imphal, Manipur. 2002

▪General Observer - M.L.A Chennai, Tamil Nadu. 00

▪General Observer - M.P Basti, Uttar Pradesh. 1999

▪General Observer - M.L.A Sirsa, Haryana. 1998

▪General Observer - M.P Hoshiyarpur, Punjab. 1996

▪General Observer - M.L.C Latur, Maharashtra. 1991

Positions held in the Maharashtra Government 

 Hon'ble Member - Maharashtra Revenue Tribunal (Judicial)
4th State Finance Commission Chairman - Maharashtra
 Chief Secretary - Government of Maharashtra
 Additional Chief Secretary - Revenue Department Maharashtra.
 Additional Chief Secretary - Forest Department Maharashtra.
 Principal Secretary - Cooperation and Labour Department 
 Principal Secretary - Animal Husbandry, Fisheries, Dairy Department 
 Secretary - Trade, Commerce, Mining Department 
 Secretary - Social Welfare Department 
Secretary - Sports, Vocational Department 
 Secretary - Home Department (Preventive Detention) 
 CEO - Home Department (Maritime Security, Operations, Personnel)
Commissioner of Thane Municipal Corporation
Commissioner of Nashik Municipal Corporation
Addl. Commissioner - Aurangabad 
Addl. Commissioner - Nagpur
 Collector and District Magistrate  -  Bhandara
Collector and District Magistrate  - Osmanabad 
 Settlement Commissioner, Maharashtra
Chairman - PCNTDA, Pradikaran. 
Managing Director - MSSC, Govt. of Maharashtra 
 CEO - Zilla Parishad, Buldhana
CEO - Zilla Parishad, Nagpur
CEO - Zilla Parishad, Chandrapur
Assistant Collector - Nashik
 Assistant Collector - Jalna

Ex-Officio Membership (2003-2011) 
▪Chairman - State Civil Services Board (IAS, IPS, Central Services)

▪Chairman - High Power Committees (P.D.S, Infra Development, Medical Education, Public Health, Irrigation, Police Establishments, State Security, Urban Development & Rural Development Board)

▪Chairman - CIDCO, MIDC, MADC, YASHADA, SIAC, NABARD

▪Member - State Civil Services Board (IFoS)

▪Member - Maharashtra Judicial Academy

Personal Details  
J P Dange is married to Kanta Dange who is a former school teacher and ex-president of 'IASOWA' Maharashtra. They have two sons and one daughter. All of them are medical post-graduates, eldest son and daughter belong to 2004 batch of Civil Services.

References

Government of Maharashtra
Indian Administrative Service officers